The 1st constituency of Eure-et-Loir is a French legislative constituency in the Eure-et-Loir département.

It is based in the city of Chartres.

Assembly Members

Election results

2022 

 
 
 
 
 

 
 
 
 
 * LR dissident, not supported by UDC alliance.

2017

2012

September 2008

January–February 2008

2007

References

Sources
 Official results of French elections from 1998: 

1